Events in the year 1867 in Belgium.

Incumbents
Monarch: Leopold II
Head of government: Charles Rogier

Events
February
 2 February – Mines across the Charleroi coalfield closed by strikes.
 23 February – Commercial treaty with the Austrian Empire, mutually granting most favoured nation status.

April
 25 April – Prince Philippe, Count of Flanders, marries Princess Marie of Hohenzollern-Sigmaringen

May
 11 May – Treaty of London establishes independence of Luxembourg; Prussian forces evacuated from Grand-Duchy.
 17 May – New criminal code published.
 19 May – Paper ballots introduced in elections.

July
 Delhaize Brothers begin trading.
 11-18 July – 2,400 Belgian Volunteers visit London, received by the Lord Mayor, entertained by the Wimbledon Volunteers, and a ball held in their honour at the Agricultural Hall, Islington, attended by Prince Albert.

August
 2 August – Peter Benoit becomes head of the Antwerp conservatory.

September
 2-7 September – Third Catholic Congress in Mechelen.

December
 8 December – Victor-Auguste-Isidor Deschamps named Archbishop of Mechelen in succession to the recently deceased Engelbert Sterckx (enthroned 28 January 1868).

Publications
Periodicals
Almanach royal officiel (Brussels, E. Guyot)
 Collection de précis historiques, 16, edited by Edouard Terwecoren

Books
 Charles De Coster, La Légende d'Uylenspiegel (Brussels)

Births
 19 January – Jean Delville, painter (died 1953)
 28 February – William Degouve de Nuncques, painter (died 1935)
 2 April – Louise Danse, painter (died 1948)
 6 April – Maurice De Wulf, philosopher (died 1947)
 15 May – Jef Leempoels, painter (died 1935)
 27 May – Anna De Weert, painter (died 1950)
 4 August – Valerius de Saedeleer, painter (died 1941)
 7 August – Léo d'Ursel, diplomat (died 1934)
 10 August – Bruno Destrée, monk-poet (died 1919) 
 21 June – Meyrianne Héglon, opera singer (died 1942)
 8 November
 Léopold Charlier, violinist (died 1936)
 Léon Houa, cyclist (died 1918)
 27 December – Léon Delacroix, prime minister (died 1929)

Deaths
 10 January – Alfred Mosselman (born 1810), industrialist
 2 March – Frans-Andries Durlet (born 1816), architect
 4 June – Jan Teichmann (born 1788), engineer
 10 September – Jules de Saint-Genois (born 1813), politician
 12 November – Charles Frédéric Dubois (born 1804), naturalist
 4 December – Engelbert Sterckx (born 1792), archbishop

References

 
Belgium
Years of the 19th century in Belgium
1860s in Belgium
Belgium